The Brighton wainscot (Oria musculosa) is a moth of the family Noctuidae.

It is found in mainland Europe, north Africa and east across the Palearctic to Central Asia, with a separated population in South Africa.
It is nationally scarce in Britain where it may be confined to Salisbury Plain, and was pronounced extinct as a resident species by 2013.

Technical description and variation

O. musculosa Hbn. (= nervosa Stph., flava Frr., frumentalis Lindem., flavescens Hmps.) (48 f). Forewing whitish ochreous suffused with yellowish, the pale ground colour showing as streaks along the folds and an oblique streak from apex to end of cell, where the reniform is marked by a pale blotch with a grey spot at its lower end: veins towards termen grey-tinged; hindwing whitish, washed with grey, the veins darker; laeta Alph. is a small, pale, yellowish form from Central Asia.  Larva pale greenish, with four dark lines at even distances apart, forming spots on the anal segment; head redbrown; thoracic plate yellow; spiracles black. The wingspan is 28–34 mm.

Biology
The moth flies in July and August.

The larvae feed internally from autumn to spring in the stems of cereal crops. including Rye and also in Calamagrostis epigeios.

References

External links

Lepiforum.de

Moths described in 1808
Moths of Europe
Owlet moths of Africa
Moths of the Middle East
Moths of Africa
Moths of Asia
Taxa named by Jacob Hübner